Aušra or Auszra (literally: dawn) was the first national Lithuanian newspaper. The first issue was published in 1883, in Ragnit, East Prussia, Germany   (newspaper credited it as ) East Prussia's ethnolinguistic part - Lithuania Minor. Later it was published monthly in Tilsit (present-day Sovetsk). Even though only forty issues were published and the circulation did not exceed 1,000, it was a significant event as it marked the beginnings of the Lithuanian national rebirth that eventually resulted in an independent Lithuanian State (1918–1940). This period, between 1883 and 1904, when the Lithuanian press ban was enforced by Tsarist authorities, has been referred to as the Aušros gadynė (the Dawn Period). Due to financial difficulties the printing was discontinued in 1886.

History
After the Russian authorities denied permission to publish a Lithuanian newspaper in Vilnius, Jonas Šliūpas proposed to publish it in East Prussia, Germany. However, he was perceived as too radical, and Jurgis Mikšas, the printer, invited Jonas Basanavičius to become its first editor. During its three years of existence, Aušra had a total of five editors. After Mikšas had to resign due to personal reasons, Šliūpas was entrusted to oversee future publications. However, he ran into conflicts with Basanavičius, who was living in Bulgaria. Šliūpas also had issues with the German authorities due to his involvement in nationalistic movements and had to leave Prussia in 1884. The other editors, Martynas Jankus and Jonas Andziulaitis, did not engage in polemic writing and the controversies calmed down. Soon Mikšas ran into debt and could no longer support the newspaper. The printing was discontinued.

After Aušra was discontinued, new Lithuanian-language periodicals appeared. Varpas (literally: The Bell) was a secular newspaper, while Šviesa was more conservative and was a religiously oriented publication.

The newspaper was published outside Lithuania proper because of the Lithuanian press ban that had been enforced by the authorities of the Russian Empire since the Uprising in 1863. It was prohibited to publish anything in the Lithuanian language using the Latin alphabet; the government wished to force the people to use Grazhdanka, a Cyrillic alphabet. Printing in the Latin alphabet was organized abroad, mostly in Lithuania Minor; knygnešiai (literally: book smugglers) would carry the printed materials across the German-Russian border. This was one of the ways Aušra would reach its readers. The other way was in sealed envelopes.

Content
More than 70 people contributed to Aušra. The writers, or Aušrininkai, came from families of well-to-do peasants that started to appear after serfdom was abolished in 1863. Most of the authors received education in the Russian universities and were fluent in Polish. Because of frequent changes in editorial staff, the newspaper did not have a clear and well-defined agenda. Basanavičius did not envision Aušra as a political publication; in the first issue he declared that the newspaper would deal only with cultural matters. However, Aušra soon took on a nationalistic agenda. Aušra helped to crystallize many ideas about the Lithuanian nation and the definition of a Lithuanian. It started to reject the ideas of resurrecting the old Polish–Lithuanian Commonwealth. The authors started to think about an independent Lithuanian nation-state.

It published on many different subjects like agriculture or reports from Lithuanian communities in the United States, but history was the most popular. The foreword of the first issue began with a Latin proverb, Homines historiarum ignari semper sunt pueri, or People ignoring history remain children forever. They built upon the works of Simonas Daukantas, the first historian, who wrote history of Lithuania in Lithuanian and painted an idealized image of the mighty Grand Duchy of Lithuania. Aušra was critical regarding the forceful Polonisation executed by the Polish clergy and Tsarist Russification. One of the main aims of Aušra editors was to gain the usage rights to Lithuanian language and to revive its prestige.

The newspaper was directed at the intelligentsia and therefore limited its readership. The peasants did not appreciate that Aušra was secular and did not embrace Catholic traditions.

References

External links
 Full-image scans of Aušra

Publications established in 1883
Publications disestablished in 1886
1883 establishments in Germany
1886 disestablishments in Germany
Lithuanian press ban
Lithuanian-language newspapers
East Prussia